Parangimalai (known in English as St. Thomas Mount) is a small hillock in Chennai, Tamil Nadu, India, near the neighbourhood of Guindy and very close to Chennai International Airport. By extension, it is also the name of the neighbourhood surrounding the hillock.

The ancient Syrian Christian community of India trace the origin of their church to St. Thomas the Apostle. From the 17th century, this part of Chennai was populated predominantly by Anglo-Indians. The St. Thomas Garrison Church is at the foot of St. Thomas Mount.

The St. Thomas Syro Malabar Catholic Church is located east of the shrine at North Silver Street, footholds of the mountain shrine.

The neighbourhood is served by the St. Thomas Mount railway station, on the southern line of the Chennai Suburban Railway Network. Integration of the Metro and MRTS with the suburban station in the neighbourhood, is expected to make the suburb the city's largest transit hub after Chennai Central.

In the state assembly elections of 1967 and 1971, there was a constituency known as the Parangimalai.

Etymology 
According to tradition, Sage Bhringi resided and meditated on the hillock in his quest to see Lord Shiva. The locality thus came to be known as Bhringi malai, or "the hill of Bhringi", which over time morphed as "Parangimalai". It is also said that this connects several other regions in the city with the origin of their names. For instance, the place where he laid his pitcher, known in Tamil as kindi while performing worship, has now come to be known as "Guindy".

The place is named St. Thomas Mount in English in honour of Saint Thomas the Apostle, who lived and preached in the locality

Hill shrine 
A shrine dedicated to "Our Lady of Expectation" (Mother Mary) was built in 1523 on top of the Mount. The altar of this shrine was built on the spot where St. Thomas' death is traditionally believed to have been occurred. At the northern foot of the mount, is a gateway of four impressive arches surmounted by a cross bearing the inscribed date 1547. A flight of 160 steps leads up to the summit of the mount. There are 14 stations of the cross on the way to the summit.

Educational institutions 
St. Thomas Mount has several schools and training institutions.

Schools 

 St. Dominic's Anglo-Indian Higher Secondary School was founded in July 1901 Holy Apostles Convent European School for children of the British and Anglo Indian Army Personnel.  In 1914 it was renamed as St Dominic's School. In 1978 Class 12 was added.

 Marian Matriculation Higher Secondary School is an English medium, co-educational senior secondary school from lower kindergarten (LKG) to class 12.

 St. Thomas Academy is an English medium, co-educational higher secondary school started in July 2017 and by 2022 had about 400 students.  It is affiliated with the Central Board of Secondary Education (CBSE).
 Montfort Matriculation Higher Secondary School is a highly regarded institution that opened in 2002 at this location. Presently, the school has 2500+ students from Kindergarten to Grade Twelve.

Vocational training institutes 
 St Theresa of Child Jesus School of Nursing is located in St. Thomas Hospital.  Started in 1993, by 2012 it was admitting 20 students annually.
 Montfort Technical Institute is a private industrial training institute (ITI).  Established in Jan 1972, it is one of 326 private ITIs in the state of Tamil Nadu.

Governance 
The St. Thomas Mount block is a revenue block in the Chengalpattu district of Tamil Nadu, India. The block included 121,017 household with a total population of 475,995. The sex ratio was 978.7 females per 1,000 males. The number of children in the age group 0-6 years was 55,103. Scheduled castes numbered 74,322 (15.6%) and scheduled tribes were 2.544 (0.53%). The literacy rate was 77.6%, with males at 81.3% and females at 73.9%.

The following 15 rural village panchayats come under St Thomas Mount Panchayat Union:

Agaramthen
Medavakkam
Kovilambakkam
Cowl bazaar
Mudichur
Perumbakkam
Nanmangalam
Polichalur
Trisulam
Ottyambakkam
Thiruvanchery
Vengaivasal
Madurapakkam
Moovarasampattu
Sithalapakkam

Gallery

Exterior of the Church

Interior of the Church

Stations of the Cross 
The 14 Stations of the Cross are positioned along the 160-step climb up the Mount.

Views from the Mount

References

External links
 St. Thomas Mount National Shrine
 St. Thomas and San Thome, Mylapore
 

Sacred mountains
Churches in Chennai
Neighbourhoods in Chennai
Eastern Catholic shrines